The Men's 10 km competition of the 2022 European Aquatics Championships will be held on 21 August.

Results
The race was started at 10:00.

References

2022 European Aquatics Championships